Elysia amakusana is a species of sea slug, a marine gastropod mollusc in the family Plakobranchidae.

Distribution
This marine species is endemic to Australia and occurs off eastern Australia.

References

 Baba, K. (1955). "Opisthobranchia of Sagami Bay, Supplement 69". Tokyo: Iwanami Shoten.
 Jensen K.R. (2007) "Biogeography of the Sacoglossa (Mollusca, Opisthobranchia)". Bonner Zoologische Beiträge 55:255–281.

External links
 

Plakobranchidae
Gastropods described in 1955